The Women's 7.5 km sprint biathlon competition of the Sochi 2014 Olympics took place at Laura Biathlon & Ski Complex on 9 February 2014. It was won by Anastasiya Kuzmina from Slovakia, who was the defending champion. Olga Vilukhina from Russia won the silver medal, and Vita Semerenko from Ukraine won the bronze. Semerenko had competed in this event at the Olympics but never previously won an Olympic medal.

Summary
Evi Sachenbacher-Stehle took an early lead in the event, after missing one target in the standing shooting. Soon, her result was improved by four seconds by Anaïs Bescond, also with one missing target. Kuzmina, who started 33rd (compared to Bescond's 14th starting number) shot flawlessly and edged Bescond by 29.9 seconds. Later Bescond was pushed from the medal position first by Karin Oberhofer (2 seconds), and then by Vilukhina (8 seconds to Oberhofer). Semerenko, who after the second shooting was fifth, by 5.9 km was second, ahead of Vilukhina, but at the finish line lost 2.2 seconds to Vilukhina, taking bronze and pushing Oberhofer out of the medal position. Dorothea Wierer, who was third after the standing shooting (behind Kuzmina and Vilukhina) finished sixth.

On 27 November 2017, Russian biathlete Olga Vilukhina was stripped of her olympic medal due to doping violations. Her teammate Yana Romanova was also disqualified. On 1 December 2017, Olga Zaitseva from Russia was disqualified. On 24 September 2020, the Court of Arbitration for Sport removed the sanctions from biathletes Olga Vilukhina, Yana Romanova, but upheld them on their teammate Olga Zaitseva.

Schedule
All dates and times are (UTC+4).

Results
The race was started at 18:30.

References

Sprint